Myctophum brachygnathum, the short-jawed lanternfish, is a species of lanternfish.

References

External links

Myctophidae
Taxa named by Pieter Bleeker
Fish described in 1856